Lieutenant Colonel Hugh Richard Scarlett, 7th Baron Abinger,  (25 November 1878 – 21 July 1943) was a British Army officer and peer.

Family
Scarlett was the son of Lieutenant Colonel Leopold James Yorke Campbell Scarlett, himself son of Peter Campbell Scarlett, third son of James Scarlett, 1st Baron Abinger. His mother, Bessie Florence Gibson, was the daughter of Edward Gibson, but had been adopted by Sir Percy Florence Shelley, 3rd Baronet, and his wife. On the death of his kinsman, the 4th Baron Abinger, in December 1903, Scarlett's elder brother Shelley Scarlett succeeded as the 5th Baron Abinger. The following year, Hugh (along with his siblings Robert, Ruth, Percy, and Leopold) were allowed to use the style The Honourable by a Royal Warrant of Precedence. On his eldest brother's death without male heirs in 1917, the next brother Robert Scarlett succeeded as the 6th Baron Abinger. He too, died without male heirs, and Hugh succeeded to the Barony in 1927.

Scarlett married Marjorie Ursula MacPhillamy in 1913; they had three sons, James Richard Scarlett (who succeeded to the title upon his father's death), John Leopold Campbell Scarlett, and Felix Hugh Lawrence Scarlett.

Military career
Scarlett was commissioned as a second lieutenant in the Royal Artillery on 26 May 1900. He served with the Imperial Yeomanry in the Second Boer War in South Africa, seeing action in the Orange Free State and Orange River Colony in 1900. He then was stationed in Cape Colony, before he returned to England in August 1902. Promotion to the rank of lieutenant came while in South Africa, on 25 March 1902. He served in the First World War from 1914 to 1918 and was awarded the Distinguished Service Order (DSO) in 1916. He retired as a lieutenant colonel, and in the 1920s was commanding officer of the 59th (Home Counties) (Cinque Ports) Brigade, Royal Field Artillery, of the Territorial Army. Scarlett was made a Deputy Lieutenant of the County of Inverness in 1930.

References

External links

1878 births
1943 deaths
Royal Artillery officers
British Army personnel of the Second Boer War
Companions of the Distinguished Service Order
British Army personnel of World War I
Deputy Lieutenants of Inverness-shire
Hugh